Raymond or Ray Jones may refer to:

Sportspeople
Raymond Jones (architect) (1925–2022), architect and Australian rules footballer for  Collingwood, Melbourne, and South Fremantle
Ray Jones (American football) (born 1947), American football player
Raymond Jones (boxer) (1903–?), Australian boxer
Raymond Jones (cricketer) (born 1958), New Zealand cricketer
Ray Jones (cyclist) (1918–1990), English road cyclist
Ray Jones (footballer, born 1921) (1921–2008), Australian rules footballer for South Melbourne
Ray Jones (footballer, born 1924), Australian rules footballer for Geelong
Ray Jones (footballer, born 1944) (1944–2007), English footballer who played for Chester City
Ray Jones (footballer, born 1988) (1988–2007), English footballer who played for QPR

Politicians
Ray W. Jones (1855–1919), Lieutenant Governor of Minnesota
Ray Jones (Western Australia politician) (1909–1967), MLC for Midlands Province
Ray Jones (Queensland politician) (1926–2000), MLC for Cairns
Ray Jones (Kentucky politician) (born 1969), member of the Kentucky Senate
J. Raymond Jones (1899–1991), American politician from New York

Others
Ray Jones (chaplain) (born 1934), Anglican priest
Raymond Jones (composer), best known for his work on Doctor Who
Raymond F. Jones (1915–1994), American science fiction author
Raymond Ray-Jones (1886–1942), artist
Wizz Jones (Raymond Ronald Jones, born 1939), English musician
Ad hoc pseudonym of Alistair Taylor

See also
Raymond Bark-Jones (fl. 1930s), Wales international rugby union player
Tony Ray-Jones (1941–1972), British photographer